The Hawk reissued in 1937 as The Trail of the Hawk is a 1935 American Western film directed by Edward Dmytryk. It was Dmytryk's debut film as a director.

Cast
 Bruce Lane as Jack King,  Jay Price (as Yancey Lane)
 Betty Jordan as Betty Thomas
 Dickie Jones as Dickie Thomas
 Lafe McKee as Jim King
 Rollo Dix as Jeff Murdock aka The Hawk
 Don Orlando as Tony the Cook
 Marty Joyce as Smokey
 Eddie Foster
 Zanda the Dog as Zanda
 Ramblin' Tommy Scott as Tommy

References

External links
 

1935 films
1935 Western (genre) films
American Western (genre) films
American black-and-white films
Films directed by Edward Dmytryk
1935 directorial debut films
Films based on works by James Oliver Curwood
1930s English-language films
1930s American films